Luke Campbell (born 22 November 1994) is a German athlete specialising in the 400 metres hurdles. He represented Germany at the 2018 European Championships in Berlin narrowly missing the final. He later competed at the 2019 World Championships in Doha reaching the semifinals.

He has an American father and a German mother.

His personal best in the event is 49.14 seconds set in La Chaux-de-Fonds in 2018.

International competitions

References

1994 births
Living people
German people of African-American descent
German male hurdlers
World Athletics Championships athletes for Germany
Eintracht Frankfurt athletes
Salisbury Sea Gulls athletes
Athletes (track and field) at the 2020 Summer Olympics
Olympic athletes of Germany